mklivecd is a script for Linux distributions that allows for one to compile a "snapshot" of the current hard drive partition and all data which resides in it (all settings, applications, documents, bookmarks, etc.) and compress it into an ISO 9660 CD-image. This allows easy backup of a user's data and also makes it easy to create customized Linux-distribution.  Some Linux-distributions like PCLinuxOS include a graphical frontend for easier script usage.

Used by
 AmaroK Live CD
 Dreamlinux
 Mandriva Linux
 Ruby on Rails Live CD
 Unity Linux Live CD

See also 
 Live CD
 Software remastering
 Remastersys, a similar tool (for Debian/Ubuntu)
 List of remastering software

External links
 mklivecd source code
 mklivecd project page (obsolete)

Backup software for Linux